Liu Xuxu is a professional wushu taolu athlete from Hong Kong. Within three renditions of the World Wushu Championships, she has already become a nine-time medalist and five-time world champion.

Career 
Originally a member of the Shandong Wushu Team, Liu relocated to Hong Kong and made her debut at the 2015 World Wushu Championships in Jakarta, Indonesia, where she became the world champion in daoshu and duilian, and also won a silver medal in changquan. Her success qualified her for the 1st Taolu World Cup in Fuzhou, China, where she became a triple gold medalist in her primary disciplines and also won a bronze medal in duilian. A year later, she competed in the 2017 World Wushu Championships in Kazan, Russia, and won medals of all colors in her main disciplines. At the following world cup in Yangon in 2018, she was a double gold medalist in daoshu and gunshu, but did not compete in changquan. At the 2019 World Wushu Championships, she was the gold champion in gunshu and duilian, won a silver medal in daoshu, and finished in fourth place in changquan.

References 

Living people
Hong Kong wushu practitioners
Year of birth missing (living people)